This article lists the winners and nominees for the Billboard Music Award for Top Dance/Electronic Artist.

Winners and nominees

2011 – 2013: Top Dance Artist2013 – 2013: Top EDM Artist2014 – present: Top Dance/Electronic Artist

Artists with multiple wins and nominations

4 wins
 Lady Gaga
 The Chainsmokers

2 wins
 David Guetta

8 nominations
 Calvin Harris

6 nominations
 The Chainsmokers
 David Guetta

5 nominations
 Lady Gaga
 Marshmello

3 nominations
 Avicii
 DJ Snake
 Kygo

2 nominations
 Lindsey Stirling
 Major Lazer
 Odesza
 Rihanna
 Skrillex
 Swedish House Mafia
 Zedd

References

Billboard awards